The First Fleet is the name given to the group of eleven ships carrying convicts, the first to do so, that left England in May 1787 and arrived in Australia in January 1788. The ships departed with an estimated 775 convicts (582 men and 193 women), as well as officers, marines, their wives and children, and provisions and agricultural implements. After 43 convicts had died during the eight-month trip, 732 landed at Sydney Cove.

In 2005, the First Fleet Garden, a memorial to the First Fleet immigrants, friends and others was created on the banks of Quirindi Creek at Wallabadah, New South Wales. Stonemason Ray Collins researched and then carved the names of all those who came out to Australia on the eleven ships in 1788 on tablets along the garden pathways. The stories of those who arrived on the ships, their life, and first encounters with the Australian country are presented throughout the garden.

No single definitive list of people who travelled on those ships exists; however, historians have pieced together as much data about these pioneers as possible. In the late 1980s, a simple software program with a database of convicts became available for Australian school students, both as a history and an information technology learning guide. An on-line version is now hosted by the University of Wollongong.

Digitised images of the lists from the Orders in Council for the First Fleet are available on the Convict Indents Index.

The six ships that transported the First Fleet convicts were:
 Alexander
 Charlotte
 Friendship
 Lady Penrhyn
 Prince of Wales
 Scarborough

List of convicts

C

D

E

F

G

H

I

J

K

L

M

N

O

P

R

S

T

U

V

W

Y

See also
 Journals of the First Fleet
 Stories of convicts on the First Fleet
 Wallabadah, New South Wales for a garden commemorating all that were on the First Fleet.
 St John's Cemetery, Parramatta: the burial site of 50+ First Fleeters, 17 of whom are commemorated with memorial plaques.

References

Bibliography

External links
 NSW State records: Convict Index
 National Library of Australia, Canberra. Searchable catalogue of art/images from the First Fleet e.g. First Fleet, Ducie Collection, George Raper, Port Jackson Painter
 St. John's First Fleeters: an edited collection of biographies on 50+ First Fleeters buried at St John's Cemetery, Parramatta, published on The St. John's Cemetery Project.

Australian penal colonies
 
Convicts on the First Fleet, List of
First Fleet
1787 in Great Britain
Australian crime-related lists